The 1949–50 Czechoslovak Extraliga season was the seventh season of the Czechoslovak Extraliga, the top level of ice hockey in Czechoslovakia. Eight teams participated in the league, and ATK Praha won the championship.

Standings

1. Liga-Qualification

External links
History of Czechoslovak ice hockey

Czechoslovak Extraliga seasons
Czech
1949 in Czechoslovak sport
1950 in Czechoslovak sport